Andrew J. Mills (May 8, 1841 – December 25, 1925) was an American politician in the state of Washington. He served in the Washington House of Representatives from 1895 to 1897, alongside M. S. Fishburn.

References

1841 births
1925 deaths
People from Lake County, Illinois
Republican Party members of the Washington House of Representatives